Evelyn Perpetua Owens (22 January 1931 – 26 September 2010) was an Irish Labour Party politician and trade union activist.

Life
Owens was born in the Dublin suburb of Clontarf, the daughter of William Owens, from County Roscommon, and Ellen (née Monaghan), from County Galway. She grew up partly in Limerick but mostly in Clontarf, and, following secondary education at Holy Faith Secondary School, Clontarf, began work for Dublin Corporation in the city treasurer's department. While working, she studied for a diploma in public administration, during evenings, at Trinity College Dublin.

During her time working in the Corporation, she became an advocate of equal pay for women, and became active in the Irish Local Government Officials' Union (now part of the Fórsa trade union). She held several senior union positions before being elected the first woman president of the union in 1967. She was a member of the public services committee of the Irish Congress of Trade Unions, chairperson of its women's advisory committee and a member of the Council for the Status of Women.

She was elected to Seanad Éireann on the Labour Panel at the 1969 Seanad election, and was re-elected in 1973. She served as Leas-Chathaoirleach (Deputy Speaker) of the Seanad from 1973 to 1977. She was defeated at the 1977 Seanad election.

In 1984 she was appointed to the Labour Court, first as deputy chairperson and subsequently as chairperson, a position she held from 1994 until 1998. After her retirement in 1998, she served as a member of the board of Beaumont Hospital and of the Medical Council of Ireland.

She died in Dublin on 26 September 2010.

References

1931 births
People from Clontarf, Dublin
Irish socialist feminists
20th-century women members of Seanad Éireann
Labour Party (Ireland) senators
Members of the 12th Seanad
Members of the 13th Seanad
2010 deaths